KANS (96.1 FM) is a radio station broadcasting an adult contemporary format, licensed to Emporia, Kansas. The station is currently owned by Bill Wachter, through licensee My Town Media Inc, and features programming from Jones Radio Network.

History
The station went on the air as KGZF on 21 February 1990. On 1 May 1997, it changed its call sign to KRWV, on 18 August 2003 to KANS-FM, and on 9 September 2003 to the current KANS.

References

External links

ANS
Radio stations established in 1990
1990 establishments in Kansas